John Watts (c. 1554 – 1616) was an English merchant, Alderman and shipowner, active in the East India Company and Virginia Company and Lord Mayor of London in 1606. (Sir John Watts)

Life
The son of Thomas Watts of Buntingford, Hertfordshire, he was the owner of the Margaret and John, one of the ships paid by the city of London in 1588 to sail against the Spanish armada. Watts himself served in her as a volunteer and saw action. In 1590 the same ship was one of a fleet of merchantmen coming home from the Mediterranean, which successfully fought and repelled the Spanish galleys near Cadiz. Although Watts was not on board, throughout the war he equipped and financed privateers led by Michael Geare, William Lane and Christopher Newport. A few of his notable successes include his financed and organised expedition to the Spanish main in 1590, the expedition to Cuba the following year and James Lancaster's expedition to Recife in April 1595. Watt's received significant prize money from the success of these expeditions. Another in July 1601 took into Plymouth a prize coming from the Indies laden with China silks, satins and taffetas. At this time he was an alderman of London (Tower ward), and had been suspected of being a supporter of Robert Devereux, 2nd Earl of Essex.

He was one of the founders of the East India Company, and on 11April 1601 was elected its governor, during the imprisonment of Sir Thomas Smythe. He served as a Sheriff of the City of London in 1597. On the accession of James I he was knighted on 26July 1603, becoming Lord Mayor of London in 1606–1607, at which time he was described in a letter to the king of Spain as "the greatest pirate that has ever been in this kingdom". During the following years he was an active member of the Virginia Company. In the city of London, Watts was a member of the Clothworkers' Company.

Watts died at his seat in Hertfordshire in September 1616, and was buried on the 7th of the month at Ware.

Family
By his wife Margaret, daughter of Sir James Hawes, knt. (lord mayor in 1574), he left four sons and four daughters. The eldest son, John, served in the Cadiz expedition and was knighted for his good service in 1625; he subsequently served under George Villiers, 1st Duke of Buckingham in the Rhé expedition, and under Count Mansfeldt in the Electorate of the Palatinate; he married Mary, daughter of Thomas Bayning, and aunt of Paul Bayning, 1st Viscount Bayning, and left numerous issue. His eldest son (grandson of the lord mayor), who also became Sir John Watts, served an apprenticeship in arms under his father. He was knighted in 1642, and received a commission to raise a troop of arms for the king. Having been expelled from the governorship of Chirk Castle, he attached himself to Arthur Capell, 1st Baron Capell of Hadham, and was one of the defenders of Colchester Castle (August 1648). He compounded for delinquency by paying a fine, and was discharged on 11May 1649; however, he was forced to sell to Sir John Buck his manor of Mardocks in Ware. After the Restoration he was made receiver for Essex and Hertfordshire. He died about 1680, and was buried in the church of Hertingfordbury.

His descendants live on to this day, still remaining in England and Wales.

References

 
 

1550s births
Year of birth uncertain
1616 deaths
English merchants
English knights
16th-century births
16th-century merchants
17th-century merchants
16th-century English businesspeople
17th-century English businesspeople
Sheriffs of the City of London
17th-century lord mayors of London
Directors of the British East India Company
English people of the Anglo-Spanish War (1585–1604)
People from Buntingford